Neelambur is a suburb in Coimbatore District, Tamil Nadu. Neelambur is situated in the Eastern Part of Coimbatore. Neelambur is also the East-End of Coimbatore City. Neelambur lies on the Junction of Avinashi Road, NH 47 and NH 544. Neelambur has few Major Hospitals, Colleges, 5-Star Hotels.

Educational Institutions
Colleges
PSG Institute of Technology and Applied Research (PSG iTech)
Kathir College of Arts and Science
Kathir College of Engineering
Schools
GRD-CPF Matriculation Hr.Sec.School
Govt Middle School, Neelambur
Sri Chaitanya School
Kathir Vidhya Mandhir
Ramakrishna Vidhyalayam School

Hospitals
Royal Care Super Speciality Hospital
PSG Rural Medical Centre

Theatres and Theme Park
 Maharaja Multiplex
 Maharaja Theme Park

References 

Cities and towns in Coimbatore district
Suburbs of Coimbatore